Washington's 29th legislative district is one of forty-nine districts in Washington state for representation in the state legislature.  It includes most of Tacoma.

The district's legislators are state senator Steve Conway and state representatives Melanie Morgan (position 1) and Sharlett Mena (position 2), all Democrats.

See also
Washington Redistricting Commission
Washington State Legislature
Washington State Senate
Washington House of Representatives

References

External links
Washington State Redistricting Commission
Washington House of Representatives
Map of Legislative Districts

29